Céran is a commune in the Gers department in southwestern France.

Geography
The river Auroue forms part of the commune's eastern border.

Population

See also
Communes of the Gers department

References

Communes of Gers